Imran Khan (born 6 July 1984 in Port of Spain) is a West Indian cricketer who plays as a right arm leg spinner. Khan has mainly featured for Trinidad and Tobago in first-class and list-A matches. He has also played for Caribbean Premier League teams Barbados Tridents, Jamaica Tallawahs and the St Kitts and Nevis Patriots.

First class career
Since 2005 Khan has featured for Trinidad and Tobago in first-class and list-A regional cricketing tournaments. He started off as an opening batsman but was soon encouraged by Brian Lara to become a full time leg-spinner. In November 2019, he was named as T&T's captain for the upcoming Regional Super50 tournament. Khan was later named, in February 2022, T&T's skipper for the 2021-22 West Indies Championship, the regional first-class tournament. He has gone on to play more than 100 matches and pick up over 400 wickets in first class cricket.

T20 career
Khan became a part of the Barbados Tridents for the upcoming 2016 Caribbean Premier League season. In May 2019 Khan joined CPL team Jamaica Tallawahs. He later signed up with Caribbean Premier League side St Kitts and Nevis Patriots in August 2020.

References

External links
Cricinfo article on Imran Khan

1984 births
Living people
Cricketers from Port of Spain
Trinidad and Tobago cricketers
Barbados Royals cricketers